Martin Ludrovský (born 1 September 1973) is a Slovakian para table tennis player who has won six major titles in team events (two world, three European and one in the Summer Paralympics). He has partnered with Ján Riapoš in most of his team event titles.

He had a spinal cord injury in 2005 after being involved in a car accident in Prešov.

References

1973 births
Living people
Paralympic table tennis players of Slovakia
Sportspeople from Košice
Table tennis players at the 2012 Summer Paralympics
Table tennis players at the 2016 Summer Paralympics
Medalists at the 2012 Summer Paralympics
Paralympic medalists in table tennis
Paralympic gold medalists for Slovakia
Table tennis players at the 2020 Summer Paralympics
Slovak male table tennis players